Valentino Piacentini is a male former international table tennis player from Italy.

He won a bronze medal at the 2000 World Team Table Tennis Championships in the Swaythling Cup (men's team event) with Massimiliano Mondello, Umberto Giardina and Yang Min for Italy.

He was three times Italian champion from 1997 until 1999. He was banned for 20 months in 2008 after testing positive for cocaine.

See also
 List of table tennis players
 List of World Table Tennis Championships medalists

References

Italian male table tennis players
1978 births
Living people